ScriptX was a multimedia-oriented development environment created in 1990 by Kaleida Labs; it was discontinued as a product by the time Kaleida Labs went out of business in 1996. Unlike packages such as Macromedia Director, ScriptX was not an authoring tool for creating multimedia titles, although it did come with a built-in authoring tool. Rather, it was a general-purpose, object-oriented, multi-platform development environment that included a dynamic language and a class library. ScriptX was as applicable for implementing client–server applications as it is for authoring multimedia titles. ScriptX was designed from the ground up in an integrated fashion, making it smaller, more consistent, and easier to learn than equivalent  systems available at the time (say, a C++ environment and class library).

ScriptX was part of a complete platform for interactive multimedia. The platform had three major components: the Kaleida Media Player, the ScriptX Language Kit, and application development and authoring tools.

The Kaleida Media Player was the heart of the system. Developers could create a single application for the Kaleida Media Player instead of targeting specific operating systems like the classic Mac OS and Microsoft Windows.

ScriptX was intended to work across multiple hardware platforms and operating systems. Version 1.0 was available for Microsoft's Windows 3.1 and Apple's System 7.

The Kaleida Media Player was used to play back ScriptX titles. The appropriate KMP for Windows or System 7 must be installed on a user's computer to run a ScriptX title.

In December 1993, DARPA and NSF awarded a research grant to a consortium (the "East/West Group") composed of American universities, publishing companies, and Apple Computer (so-named because its members were drawn from both the East and West Coasts of the United States), to develop a new multimedia CD-ROM-based authoring environment for computer-based instructional material, based on ScriptX. However, the project soon encountered technical issues with the ScriptX technology, which exceeded the system requirements of many low-end machines which were expected to be used to consume the authored content; at the same time, it was increasingly becoming clear that the future was the Internet not CD-ROMs and Java had emerged as a commercially-available environment for producing cross-platform applications which met the project's requirements, without the technical issues the ScriptX-based solution had encountered. Therefore, in December 1996, the research project was relaunched using Java as a platform and further development using ScriptX was abandoned.

References

External links
 ScriptX overview page
 ScriptX and the World Wide Web (circa 1995)

Integrated development environments
Multimedia frameworks
Discontinued software